Liu Xiuhua (born 5 October 1975 in Zengcheng, Guangdong) is a Chinese weightlifter. During the 1990s she was several times World and Asian Games champion.

References

 Gottfried Schödl: World Championships Seniors 1997-2007 and Statistics , p. 95

1975 births
Living people
Chinese female weightlifters
World Weightlifting Championships medalists
Asian Games gold medalists for China
Weightlifters at the 1994 Asian Games
Weightlifters at the 1998 Asian Games
Weightlifters from Guangzhou
Medalists at the 1994 Asian Games
Medalists at the 1998 Asian Games
Asian Games medalists in weightlifting
20th-century Chinese women
21st-century Chinese women